This is a list of Vietnamese films which were released in 2014:

Notes

Links
 Vietnamese Films at Internet Movie Database

2014 in Vietnam
Vietnam
2014